Guan Zewen (born 11 November 1971) is a former synchronized swimmer from China.

References 

1971 births
Living people
Chinese synchronized swimmers
Olympic synchronized swimmers of China
Synchronized swimmers at the 1992 Summer Olympics
Synchronized swimmers from Guangdong
Synchronized swimmers at the 1991 World Aquatics Championships